El Crisol is a Panama Metro station on Line 2. It was opened on 25 April 2019 as part of the inaugural section of Line 2 between San Miguelito and Nuevo Tocumen. This is an elevated station built above Avenida Domingo Díaz in the city quarter of El Grisol. The station is located between Villa Lucre and Brisas del Golf.

References

Panama Metro stations
2019 establishments in Panama
Railway stations opened in 2019